is a 1986 Japanese film. It stars Yūsaku Matsuda, who also directed it after the planned director Yonosuke Koike dropped out due to differences with Matsuda. It is based on a manga by Marley Caribu. The title of the film is a combination of the two words aho, meaning "fool", and "performance".

Plot
A homeless man suffering from memory loss is unbeatable in a fight. He becomes involved with the Yakuza.

Cast
Yūsaku Matsuda as Kaze
Ryo Ishibashi as Michio Yamazaki
Yoko Aki as Kanako
Susumu Terajima

External links

Goo Eiga
Review of "A Homansu" by Tom Mes at Midnight Eye

Live-action films based on manga
Japanese action drama films
Films about amnesia
1980s Japanese films